Totaled!, known in Europe as Crashed for the PlayStation 2 version, and Crash for the Xbox version, is a vehicular combat game released in 2002 for the Xbox and the PlayStation 2. It was developed by British video game developer Rage Software. The object of the game is to smash each other's cars till they are "totaled".

Reception

The Xbox version of Totaled! received "mixed" reviews according to the review aggregation website Metacritic.

References

External links
 

2002 video games
Cancelled GameCube games
PlayStation 2 games
Vehicular combat games
Xbox games
Rage Games games
Majesco Entertainment games
Video games developed in the United Kingdom
Multiplayer and single-player video games